, abbreviated as MuroranIT, MuIT, or Muroran Tech is a national university in Muroran, Hokkaido, Japan.

History
1897 Sapporo Agricultural College Department of Civil Engineering Established
1918 Sapporo Agricultural College promoted to Hokkaido Imperial University.
1939 Muroran National Industrial College Established
1944 Muroran National Industrial College promoted to Muroran National College of Technology.
1949 Muroran National College of Technology and Hokkaido Imperial University Department of Civil Engineering merged and Muroran Institute of Technology were founded.

Academics
Muroran Institute of Technology is a technical institute which is composed of
 the Faculty of Engineering, a four-year course leading to a bachelor's degree, which consists of six departments
 a Graduate School, which has a two-year course in six divisions for the master's degree
 a three-year course in four divisions for a Doctoral degree.

Campus
The university has a campus covering an area of 197,485 m2 in the city of Muroran, which is at the entrance of Uchiura Bay in the southwestern part of Hokkaido.

Departments
 Department of Civil Engineering and Architecture
 Department of Mechanical, Aerospace, and Materials Engineering
 Department of Applied Sciences
 Department of Information and Electronic Engineering

References

External links 
 

Educational institutions established in 1887
Japanese national universities
Universities and colleges in Hokkaido
Engineering universities and colleges in Japan
1887 establishments in Japan
Hokkaido American Football Association